Lesbian, gay, bisexual, and transgender (LGBT) people in Latvia face legal and social challenges not experienced by non-LGBT residents. Both male and female same-sex sexual activity are legal in Latvia, but households headed by same-sex couples are ineligible for the same legal protections available to opposite-sex couples. Since May 2022, same-sex couples may have their relationship recognized by the Administrative District Court, which gives them some of the legal protections available to married (opposite-sex) couples. Nevertheless, same-sex couples are unable to marry or jointly adopt.

The democratization process in Latvia has allowed lesbians and gays to establish organizations and infrastructural elements such as bars, clubs, stores, libraries, etc. Cultural, educational and other events can be held. However, this process has only resulted in limited rights for LGBT people and society has not yet reached a high level of tolerance. LGBT persons in Latvia face widespread discrimination in society. In November 2014, Foreign Minister Edgars Rinkēvičs came out via Twitter, becoming the first openly LGBT elected official in the country. In 2023, ILGA-Europe ranked Latvia 24 out of 27 European Union countries for the protection of LGBT rights. Latvia is the only Baltic country and Northern European country which does not fully ban all anti-gay discrimination.

Law regarding same-sex sexual activity
In 1992, soon after Latvia regained independence from the Soviet Union, homosexuality was decriminalized. In 1999, the age of consent was equalized and set at 16, regardless of gender and/or sexual orientation.

Recognition of same-sex relationships

Latvia does not recognise same-sex marriage, however, a form of civil union is possible through registration with the Administrative Court since 2022.

In 2006, Latvia amended its Constitution to prohibit same-sex marriage. Article 110 of the Latvian Constitution formerly read, "The State shall protect and support marriage, the family, the rights of parents and rights of the child. The State shall provide special support to disabled children, children left without parental care or who have suffered from violence." The first sentenced of Article 110 was amended to read: "The State shall protect and support marriage – a union between a man and a woman, the family, the rights of parents and rights of the child."

On 30 January 2015, an MP submitted a proposal for a partnership law, which would have allowed "any two persons" to register a partnership. This would have given cohabiting couples almost the same benefits and obligations as marriage. The proposal was rejected by the Legal Affairs Committee on 24 February 2015. The Committee questioned the intent on changing the Civil Code, focusing on the 2006 constitutional same-sex marriage ban and how far-reaching the benefits of a "marriage-like" partnership would be, while suggesting that any new form of relationships may need to start from the ground up. Veiko Spolītis, who submitted the proposal, clarified that attaching a gender-neutral partnership provision to the existing code would be the fastest way for the bill to become law. Despite the setback, Spolītis has stated that discussions on the issue shall continue nevertheless. Fellow Unity Party member, Ilze Viņķele, has since promised to develop and submit a brand new draft law. In March 2015, a public petition was started by minor party For Latvia's Development for adopting a partnership law, which would provide for the recognition of registered and unregistered partnerships between couples of any sex. In October 2018, the Ombudsman called on lawmakers to pass a partnership law for both opposite-sex and same-sex couples, citing statistics that showed that about half of Latvian children are born out of wedlock, and that these families should enjoy legal protections and rights. On 20 June 2019, Saeima MPs voted against sending the partnership bill to further discussion and review in parliamentary commissions. Only 23 members voted for the bill, 60 voted against it and one member abstained. Supporters of the bill have said that they will persevere and try to persuade deputies to discuss it again in the future. In 2022, following a 2020 court ruling in favor of parental leave rights for same-sex couples, the Justice Ministry introduced a draft law that would create civil unions, giving same-sex couples some of the same rights and responsibilities as marriage.

In June 2018, the European Court of Justice ruled that EU members states must grant married same-sex couples, where at least one partner is an EU citizen, full residency rights and recognise their freedom of movement. No other rights of marriage are conferred to the couple.

Party positions on partnership law

Adoption and family planning
Latvian law allows any person over 25 to adopt. However, persons who are not married to each other may not adopt the same child. This means that for unmarried couples only one partner may adopt a child. However, lesbian couples can get access to IVF and assisted insemination treatment.

Discrimination protections
In September 2006, Latvia's Parliament, the Saeima, passed amendments to the Labour Code prohibiting discrimination on the basis of sexual orientation in the workplace. The Saeima had initially omitted such protections, but President Vaira Vīķe-Freiberga refused to sign the bill until it was added.

Gender identity and expression

It is possible to surgically change gender in Latvia and to legally change identity to reflect this. Latvian law does not define "sex change", but a medical certificate must be submitted to the authorities in order to legally change gender. However, in 2004, authorities denied a change of legal identity to a transgender person who had undergone a partial sex change. The person, who reported having knowledge of another case in which their legal sex was changed after a partial sex change, took legal action. The Supreme Court of Latvia ruled in 2008, that in this particular case, legal identity should have been changed as the authority had done so in similar cases and the person, already presenting as male, might face a variety of issues having to legally identify as female. This resulted in a 2009 legislative proposal to amend laws, which would have made it mandatory for transgender people to undergo sterilization (which could have caused further legal complications) in order to change their legal gender. The amendments were, however, rejected by the Saeima (Parliament).

Military service

Lesbians, gays and bisexuals are allowed to serve openly in the Latvian Armed Forces.

Living conditions

Only in the capital, Riga, is there a small gay scene. Elsewhere in Latvia, however, the sparse population means there is no gay scene. There are few publicly prominent persons who openly identify themselves as gay or lesbian, for example Latvian American journalist Kārlis Streips, Foreign Minister Edgars Rinkēvičs, and former Deputy Rector of the Riga Graduate School of Law Linda Freimane. In the 2018 parliamentary elections, Rinkēvičs was reelected as Foreign Minister and Marija Golubeva became Latvia's first openly lesbian politician, winning a seat for the Development/For! (AP!) party. AP! has declared itself a "pro-LGBT" party.

Most people in Latvia have prejudices against homosexuality, usually rooted in social conservatism and lingering preconceptions dating from the Soviet period. An example of this is the belief that homosexuality and pedophilia are linked phenomena. Such popularly-held anti-gay sentiments had grown increasingly by 2008, exploited by various religious groups and politicians.

In 2002, Māris Sants, an openly gay minister, was defrocked and excommunicated from the Evangelical Lutheran Church of Latvia. Archbishop Jānis Vanags later declared in a public statement, "Why Māris Sants was fired", that Sants was not removed from office because he was gay, but because he in his sermons publicly promoted, instead of condemning, the "sinful" homosexual "lifestyle". When pastor Juris Cālītis, then also dean of the University of Latvia's Faculty of Theology, not only publicly criticised the improper way in which Sants's case was handled by the Church Synod, but also allowed Sants to co-officiate in a church service, Cālītis, too, was removed from office and expelled from the church by Vanags. This case helped to create a public debate in Latvia regarding the need for legislation to protect LGBT persons from discrimination by employers.

Due to prevailing negative attitudes in society, and particularly the violent actions of a vocal anti-LGBT minority (e.g. National Power Unity), there is a fear that further lobbying for the rights of sexual minorities will provoke an even stronger backlash. In a February 2007 survey of 537 LGBT persons in Latvia, 82% of respondents said they were not in favour of holding the planned Riga Pride and Friendship Days 2007, while only 7% felt that these events would help promote tolerance against sexual minorities. Nevertheless, the event took place in 2007; in contrast with 2005 where counter-protestors greatly outnumbered Pride attendees and in 2006 where the event was banned. It was peaceful and the 500 pride-goers outnumbered around 100 counter-protestors. However, a simultaneous anti-Pride event attracted around 1,000 attendees. In 2015, Europride took place in Riga attracting around 5,000 participants, while a few dozens participated in a protest meeting against the event.

Baltic Pride 2018 was attended by an estimated 8,000 people. The event took place peacefully, with only about a dozen protesters.

On 23 April 2021 Normunds Kindzulis was discovered with his clothes doused in petrol and burns on 85% of his body; he later died of his injuries. Kindzulis had received homophobic death threats and was physically assaulted four times. It was unclear if the death was a murder or suicide, but the deputy chief of Latvian police said, "Driving someone to the verge of suicide is also a crime".

LGBT rights movement in Latvia

Following public manifestations of homophobia surrounding Riga Pride in 2005, some members of the LGBT community, their friends, and family members united to found the organisation Mozaīka in order to promote tolerance towards sexual minorities and LGBT rights in Latvian society. In response, an umbrella organisation for co-ordinating anti-LGBT rights activism in Latvia, NoPride, was formed in the run-up to Riga Pride and Friendship Days 2006.

Public opinion
A Eurobarometer survey published in December 2006 showed that 12% of Latvians surveyed supported same-sex marriage and 8% supported same-sex adoption (EU-wide average: 44% and 32%, respectively).

The 2015 Eurobarometer found that 19% of Latvians supported same-sex marriage (EU average: 61%). Additionally, 42% of Latvians believed that gay and lesbian people should enjoy the same rights as straight people and 23% believed that there is nothing wrong about a relationship between two people of the same sex (EU average: 71% and 67%, respectively).

Summary table

See also

Human rights in Latvia
LGBT history in Latvia
LGBT rights in Europe
LGBT rights in the European Union

References

External links